The Boston Recorder was a Congregationalist newspaper established by Nathaniel Willis (Nathaniel Parker Willis's father) and Sidney E. Morse in 1816 in Boston, Massachusetts.  It published weekly newspapers from 1817 to 1824. The paper primarily published religious news and accounts of missionary and other religious organizations, and it also published civic, agricultural, political news, and other topics. It also published Nathaniel Parker Willis's biblical poems. It merged with the Boston Telegraph to form the Boston Recorder and Telegraph.

Editors and contributors
 Nancy H. Adsit, contributor
 Harriette Newell Woods Baker, contributor
 Abijah Perkins Marvin, associate editor
 Harvey Newcomb, contributor
 Calvin Ellis Stowe, editor
 Joseph Tracy, editor
 Nathaniel Parker Willis, contributor

References

External links
 

1816 establishments in the United States
Magazines established in 1816
Magazines published in Boston